The following units and commanders of the French and Spanish armies fought in the Battle of Rocroi on May 19, 1643.

French forces
Army of Picardie

Louis II of Bourbon, Duc d'Enghien

Artillery

Henri de Chivre, Marquis de la Barre

 12 sub-par guns in two batteries

Spanish forces
Army of Flanders

Captain General Don Francisco de Melo

Artillery

Alvaro de Melo

 18 guns in nine batteries

Sources
 Higgins, David. "Battle File: Rocroi, 19 May 1643." Strategy & Tactics, Number 244 (July 2007).

Thirty Years' War orders of battle